Karungalpalayam also known as (K.G. Palayam) is a commercial suburb in the city of Erode.
Kalingarayan Canal runs through Karungalpalayam.

The area is a mix of commercial and residential buildings. The economy of this urban area is primarily textile production using power looms.

The ancient place
Karungalpalayam is one of the famous tourist locations, in the city of Erode, on Erode-Salem National Highways.

It is on the way to Kongu Tirupati and Tiruchengode, on the banks of the River Cauvery.

Sri Ragavendra Mutt is located here.

Transport
The Cauvery Bridge, spanning the River Cauvery in Karungalpalayam is the major road connectivity to Pallipalayam and further east.

Karungalpalayam is well connected with city bus services to all major parts of the city. All the city buses going towards the East will have a stop here.

Also, the Waterways Ferry Services are available here, for transporting through Cauvery River to the other banks on Namakkal District. A Ferry Station is available here.

Famous places
Mahakavi Bharathi Memorial Library is the place where Mahakavi Subramaniya Bharathi delivered his last public address. He spoke about "Man is Immortal".

Periya Mariyamman and Chinna Mariyamman are famous temples in Karungalapalayam. Also, Subrmaniyar temple, Pachchiyamman Kovil are there.

Old Head Register office of Erode is in Karungalapalayam.

Codes
PIN Code : 638 003
STD Code : 0424
Vehicle Regn. : TN 86

Temples 
Chinnamariamman Temple and Subramaniasamy Temple located in Karungalpalayam are under the control of Hindu Religious and Charitable Endowments Department, Government of Tamil Nadu.

References

External link 
 GeoHack - Karungalpalayam

Neighbourhoods in Erode